is a passenger railway station  located in the city of Kawanishi, Hyōgo Prefecture, Japan. It is operated by the private transportation company Nose Electric Railway.

Lines
I

Station layout
The station two opposed ground-level side platforms. Of all Nose Electric Railway lines, this station in particular has a curved platform, and there is a wide gap between the platform and the train. The platform has an effective length of 6 cars, but currently only 4-car trains stop here. The station is unattended.

Platforms

Adjacent stations

History
Takiyama Station opened on April 13, 1913.

Passenger statistics
In fiscal 2019, the station was used by an average of 2071 passengers daily

Surrounding area
Hyogo Prefectural Route 12 Kawanishi Sasayama Line
Kawanishi Municipal Kawanishi Kita Elementary School

See also
List of railway stations in Japan

References

External links 

 Takiyama Station official home page 

Railway stations in Hyōgo Prefecture
Stations of Nose Electric Railway
Railway stations in Japan opened in 1913
Kawanishi, Hyōgo